Rofalco was a fortified late-Etruscan settlement, located about twenty km north of Vulci, at the edge of the  volcanic plateau. The site controlled the important natural route formed by the valley of the Olpeta stream and contributed to the defense and the organization of the southeastern portion of the ancient territory of Vulci.

Known at least since the 1970s, the site was explored for the first time systematically by the Roman Archaeology Association in 1981 and soon taken into account in several studies concerning the territory. Regular excavations were started in the summer of 1996 by Mauro Incitti, with the additional goal of counteracting the damage caused by looters. In recent years, in addition to research activities, an outreach project concerning all aspects of the site has been gradually developed in accordance with the different institutions in charge. The nineteen annual excavations that have been carried out up till now were done by more than 550 Italian and foreign volunteers, who investigated the defensive structures and several of the buildings of the town.

History

Bronze Age 
Excavations conducted to date in Rofalco have identified the initial occupation of the site to the Bronze Age. The remains are limited in number and come exclusively from Etruscan layers so that the appearance of this earlier settlement cannot be reconstructed and could, in fact, be quite small, perhaps only seasonally occupied. At least three small rock niches open on the side of the ridge just below the Etruscan settlement, provide a possible reason for the rise of this prehistoric settlement.

Etruscan 
The fortress of Rofalco is located within the territory of the ancient city of Vulci and controlled the major route from Lake Mezzano and the lower course of the Fiora river, on whose banks stood Vulci. In ancient times, the valley was an important natural passage linking the Tyrrhenian coast to Lake Bolsena, the Tiber Valley and the city of Orvieto. Between the 4th and 3rd centuries BCE, southern Etruria experienced a period of political uncertainty. In the territory of Vulci, this situation led to a reorganization of the campaigns and a foundation of medium and small settlements at strategic points in order to control the territory. The fortified site of Rofalco can be taken as an example of a small strategic settlement.

Destruction 
Evidence of destruction and collapse of the buildings is often characterized by the presence of thick, burned layers; these layers are well-documented in the excavated areas of Rofalco. The discovery of clay sling bullets serves as additional evidence for the violent end of the fortress. These clay bullets have been discovered in both the destruction levels and also on the topsoil. The evidence for destruction, combined with the absence of pottery later than the first decades of the 3rd century BCE, connect the destruction of Rofalco to the triumph De Vulsiniensibus et Vulcientibus (tr. “over the people of Vulsinii and Vulcii”) by the Roman consul Tiberius Coruncanius in 280 BCE (Fasti Triumphales, 280/279, Feb. 1st). The defeat of Vulci had grave consequences for the urban centers of the territory. In fact, evidence of destruction and fire, quite similar to those found in Rofalco, were found also in Sovana, Saturnia, Ghiaccio Forte, and Doganella.

Modern period 
After the violent destruction of the Etruscan settlement, Rofalco does not appear to have been occupied or visited in the later periods. The next occupation dates to the Renaissance and was largely for agricultural purposes. The discovery of a few fragments of majolica and glazed pottery, iron tools, as well as traces of plowing, and stone clearances belonging to the Renaissance are observed in several areas scattered over the site.

References

Further reading 
O. Cerasuolo, Quattordici anni di ricerche nella fortezza tardo-etrusca di Rofalco, in L. Frazzoni (ed.), «Atti della giornata di studi in memoria di Mauro Incitti», Farnese 2009, 23-36

O. Cerasuolo, Rofalco: the Etruscan fortress and the Roman conquest of Vulci, in Etruscan News 16, winter 2014, 8

O. Cerasuolo-L. Pulcinelli, La fortezza di Rofalco, Forma Urbis 12, 9 (September 2007), 4-13

L. Pulcinelli, Etruschi e romani nel Lamone: ricerche di topografia antica in territorio castrense, in L. Frazzoni (ed), «Atti della giornata di studi in memoria di Mauro Incitti», Farnese 2009, 80-92

L. Pulcinelli, Etruria ellenistica: l'architettura militare e l'urbanistica, in V. Jolivet (ed), «Etruria ellenistica, Meetings between Cultures in the Ancient Mediterranean», Bollettino di Archeologia online, 1, 2010, vol. F/F8/4

Rendeli M., “L’oppidum di Rofalco nella Selva del Lamone”, in Carandini A. (a cura di), La romanizzazione dell’Etruria: il territorio di Vulci. Orbetello, Polveriera Guzman, 24 maggio - 20 ottobre 1985, Milano, 1985, pp. 60–61.

Rendeli M., “Note sul popolamento e sull’economia etrusca in due zone campione degli entroterra vulcente e ceretano”, in Atti del II Congresso Internazionale Etrusco. Firenze, 1985, Firenze, 1989, pp. 545–546.

Rendeli M., Città aperte, Roma, 1993, pp. 214–219.

Incitti M., “L’abitato fortificato di Rofalco nell’entroterra vulcente (Viterbo)”, in Archeologia uomo territorio, XVIII, 1999, pp. 5–21.

Incitti M. - Cerasuolo O. - Pulcinelli L., “Rofalco. Un emporium fortificato all’alba del III sec. a.C.”, in Attema P. – Nijboer A. – Zifferero A. (a cura di), Papers in Italian Archaeology VI. Communities and Settlements from the Neolithic to the Early Medieval Period. Proceedings of the 6th Conference of Italian Archaeology held at the University of Groningen, Groningen Institute of Archaeology, The Netherlands, April 15–17, 2003, Oxford, 2005, pp. 944–948.

Cerasuolo O. - Pulcinelli L. - Rubat Borel F., “Rofalco (Farnese, VT). Una fortezza vulcente tra la metà del IV e i primi decenni del III secolo a.C.”, in La città murata in Etruria. Atti del XXV Convegno di Studi Etruschi e Italici. Chianciano Terme, Chiusi, Sarteano, Montalcino, 30 marzo - 3 aprile 2005, c.s.

Cerasuolo O., "Quattordici anni di ricerche nella fortezza tardo etrusca di Rofalco", in Frazzoni L. (a cura di) Atti della giornata di studi in memoria di Mauro Incitti, Farnese 2009, pp. 23–36

Pulcinelli L., "Etruschi e romani nel Lamone: ricerche di topografia antica in territorio castrense", in Frazzoni L.(a cura di) Atti della giornata di studi in memoria di Mauro Incitti, Farnese 2009, pp. 80–92

Cerasuolo O. - Pulcinelli L."Contributi per la carta archeologica del territorio vulcente. Selva del Lamone, Valle dell'Olpeta e zone adiacenti", in Marangio C., Laudizi G. (a cura di) Palaia philia. Studi di topografia antica in onore di Giovanni Uggeri, Galatina 2009, pp. 397–416

"La fortezza di Rofalco. Vita quotidiana degli ultimi etruschi", catalogo della mostra, Acquapendente 2010

External links 
 Gruppo Archeologico Romano

Archaeological sites in Lazio
Etruscan sites